The 1928 Louisiana Tech Bulldogs football team was an American football team that represented the Louisiana Polytechnic Institute—now known as Louisiana Tech University—as a member of the Southern Intercollegiate Athletic Association (SIAA) during the 1928 college football season. Led by first-year head coach Tod Rockwell, Louisiana Tech compiled an overall record of 2–7. The team's captain was Bill Slay.

Schedule

References

Louisiana Tech
Louisiana Tech Bulldogs football seasons
Louisiana Tech Bulldogs football